Skyactiv (branded as SKYACTIV) is a brand name for a series of automobile technologies developed by Mazda that increase fuel efficiency and engine output. The initial announcement of the Skyactiv technologies included new engines, transmissions, body, and chassis, which appeared in Mazda products from 2011 onwards.

The Mazda Sky concept
The precursor of Skyactiv, which featured a Mazda Sky-G 2.3-liter direct injection gas engine, a Mazda Sky-D 2.2-liter diesel engine, a Sky-Drive automatic transmission, a Mazda Kiyora with Sky-G 1.3 engine and Sky-Drive automatic transmission, was unveiled at the 40th Tokyo Motor Show in 2008. The Skyactiv concept features a revised suspension geometry, improved automatic and manual transmission, and various improvements to Mazda's L- engine such as direct injection, upgraded exhaust manifold, increased compression ratio for cleaner burn and higher thermal efficiency, etc. Mazda's previous chassis for the Mazda3 and Mazda6 were carried over to the new vehicles.

Skyactiv-G

The Skyactiv-G is a family of direct injection petrol engines. The engine compression ratio is increased to 14.0:1. To reduce the risk of engine knock at high compression, residual gas is reduced by using 4-2-1 engine exhaust systems, implementing a piston cavity, and optimizing fuel injection. In addition, combustion duration is shortened by intensifying air flow, increasing injection pressure, and using multi-hole injectors.

It features an all-aluminum construction with chain-driven dual overhead camshafts with VVT and gasoline direct injection; with direct ignition, it meets ULEV emission standards.  Skyactiv-G engines for the U.S. market have a lower compression ratio of 13:1 allowing them to operate on standard instead of premium fuel with an approximate 3-5 percent reduction in torque and fuel economy.

1.3 L 
The Skyactiv-G 1.3 (P3-VPS) is a naturally aspirated variant with  engine displacement and features a  bore and an  stroke.  The engine was unveiled at the 2011 Automotive Engineering Exposition.

Five Mazda engineers were awarded the 2011 Japan Society of Mechanical Engineers Medal on April 20, 2012 specifically for the "development of a petrol engine (1.3 L) with a super-high compression ratio and achieving fuel efficiency of 30 km per litre (under Japan's 10-15 cycle)". The engine was first used in the Mazda Demio 1.3-Skyactiv, being the only Skyactiv engine to be paired with a CVT.

Applications:
 2011–present Mazda Demio/Mazda2

1.5 L  
The Skyactiv-G 1.5, or (PR-VP RS) for RWD applications and (P5 VPS F-P5) for FWD applications, is a  naturally aspirated engine with a  bore and an  stroke.

This new petrol engine added to the Skyactiv line-up achieves a high compression ratio of 13.0:1 (14.0:1 in some markets). It greatly improves dynamic performance and fuel economy over the MZR 1.5 engine of the previous model.

Applications:
 2014–present Mazda Axela/Mazda3
 2014–present Mazda Demio/Mazda2
 2016–present Mazda Roadster/MX-5
 2016–2020 Scion iA/Toyota Yaris (North America)
 2020–present Mazda CX-3

2.0 L  
The Skyactiv-G 2.0 (PE-VPS) was the first engine in the Skyactiv-G family to be produced.

According to Mazda, it is more fuel efficient than the engine it replaces.

The MX-5 ND2 2019 facelift received an updated engine producing  with maximum RPM raised from 6800 to 7500 rpm and includes a larger intake manifold, increased injection pressure and a new exhaust system that scavenges the cylinders more quickly.

Applications:

 2012–present Mazda Axela/Mazda3
 2013–present Mazda Atenza/Mazda6
 2013–present Mazda CX-5
 2013–2018 Mazda Biante
 2013–2015 Mazda Premacy/Mazda5
 2015–present Mazda CX-3
 2016–present Mazda Roadster/MX-5
 2016–present Mazda CX-4 (China)
 2019–present Mazda CX-30

2.5 L  
The Skyactiv-G 2.5 (PY-VPS) is a  naturally aspirated engine first used in the 2013 Mazda 6 and features an  bore and a  stroke.

Skyactiv-G 2.5 engines manufactured from 2018 onwards feature cylinder deactivation to improve fuel efficiency. In July 2019, approximately 262,000 Mazda vehicles using the engine were recalled for a faulty powertrain control module that may cause a misfire or a loss in power.

Maximum boost pressure is 17.4 psi. A specially-designed set of passages and butterfly valves acts at low engine RPMs to force exhaust gases through smaller orifices, spooling the turbo more quickly and minimizing turbo lag. Additionally, the engine has a unique 4-3-1 exhaust manifold to improve exhaust scavenging and a cooled exhaust gas recirculation system, both designed to reduce combustion chamber temperatures and allow for increased boost with better fuel mileage. On the CX-9 and CX-5, the engine is equipped with an air-to-air intercooler, while on the Mazda3 and CX-30, an air-to-liquid intercooler is integrated into the intake manifold to save space.

For the CX-60, the engine is paired with a plug-in hybrid system which includes a  electric motor and a 17.8 kWh lithium-ion battery.

Applications:
 2013–present Mazda Atenza/Mazda6
 2013–present Mazda CX-5
 2014–present Mazda Axela/Mazda3
 2016–present Mazda CX-4
 2016–present Mazda CX-9
 2018–present Mazda CX-8
 2019–present Mazda CX-30
 2022–present Mazda CX-50
 2022–present Mazda CX-60
 2022–present Mazda CX-60 PHEV
 2023–present Mazda CX-90 PHEV

3.3 L 
The Skyactiv-G 3.3 is a longitudinally-positioned, inline-six 3.3-litre turbocharged petrol engine that was introduced in the Mazda CX-90 in 2023 and comes in two outputs.

 2023–present Mazda CX-60
 2023–present Mazda CX-90

Skyactiv-X

Skyactiv-X is the first commercial petrol engine to use homogeneous charge compression ignition (HCCI), in which the fuel-air mixture ignites spontaneously when compressed by a smaller, separately ignited charge of fuel. This allows it to reach a compression ratio of 16:1 instead of 14.0:1 of previous generation and operate much leaner than a spark ignition engine, reducing fuel consumption and emissions.

This engine targets 20-30% greater fuel efficiency by utilising HCCI technology. In order to handle ignition problems caused by compression ignition, each cylinder also incorporates a spark plug featuring Spark Controlled Compression Ignition (SPCCI) technology. A small Roots-type supercharger further expands the compression ignition operating window by feeding more air into the engine, leaning out the mixture sufficiently for compression ignition even at higher speeds. 

SPCCI works by drawing in a lean, homogeneous air-fuel mixture, it then compresses the mixture until it approaches the point at which it would spontaneously detonate. A second injector then adds a secondary charge of fuel directly on the spark plug. This secondary charge is ignited by the spark plug, causing the cylinder pressure to very quickly rise to a point where the rest of the fuel undergoes compression ignition. The presence of the spark plug allows the engine to also operate as a spark-ignition engine under some operating conditions, such as high-speed high-load situations.

Mazda is developing an inline-six variant of the Skyactiv-X, with displacements of 3.0 and 3.3 liters and a rear-wheel-drive layout. It was believed that production of the new engine would begin in 2022 with the Mazda CX-60 and possibly a fourth generation rear-wheel drive Mazda6. However, according to Road & Track magazine, in the March 2022 edition of Autocar magazine Mazda Europe's Development & Engineering Senior Manager Joachim Kunz stated that there were no plans for a Mazda rear drive sedan, since Mazda was prioritizing SUV sales.

2.0 L 
Applications:
 2019–present Mazda3
 2019–present Mazda CX-30

3.0 L 
Applications:
 2022–present Mazda CX-60

Skyactiv-D

Skyactiv-D is a family of turbocharged diesel engines, designed to comply with global emissions regulations.

To eliminate the need of NOx and particulate treatment in contemporary diesel engines, the cylinder compression ratio is reduced to 14.0:1. Cold engine start is achieved via multi-hole piezo injectors with 3 programmable injection patterns, and adoption of ceramic glow plugs. Engine misfiring is prevented via variable valve lift at exhaust, which opens exhaust valves during the intake stroke, which increases engine air temperature. The Skyactiv-D also uses a two-stage turbocharger, in which one small and one large turbo are selectively operated, according to driving conditions.

1.5 L 
The Skyactiv-D 1.5 (S5-DPTS/S5-DPTR) is a  first introduced in the fourth generation Mazda Demio/Mazda2. It features a compression ratio of 14:1.

Applications:
 2014–2017 Mazda Demio/Mazda2
 2014–2018 Mazda Axela/Mazda3
 2015–2018 Mazda CX-3

1.8 L 
The Skyactiv-D 1.8 (S8-DPTS/S8-DPTR) is a  that was introduced in the 2018 facelifted Mazda CX-3.

Applications:
 2018–present Mazda CX-3
 2019–present Mazda3
 2019–present Mazda CX-30

2.2 L 
The Skyactiv-D 2.2 (SH-VPTS/SH-VPTR) is a  that was the first Skyactiv-D engine used in production vehicles. It was first used in the Mazda CX-5. An upgraded version of the Skyactiv-D was run in the 2013 Rolex Sports Car Series season and helped Mazda win the GX manufacturer's championship. The engine is slated to be used again in two Lola LMP2s in the United SportsCar Series.

Applications: 

 2012–present Mazda CX-5
 2012–present Mazda 6
 2013–2018 Mazda 3
 2017–present Mazda CX-8

3.3 L 
The Skyactiv-D 3.3 is a longitudinally-positioned, inline-six  that was introduced in the Mazda CX-60 in 2022.

Applications:
 2022–present Mazda CX-60
 2023–present Mazda CX-90

Unique technology 
The Skyactiv-D is the first low compression diesel in a production car, having a significantly lower compression in the first generation of 14:1 rather than higher compression ratios of 16:1 and higher. Numerous university studies have investigated the benefits of low compression diesel for decades, with the major benefit noted in single cylinder university tests of being a drastic reduction in NOx emissions, while also reducing particulate matter and combustion noise. These studies all concluded that while there were noticeable reductions in emissions, this came at the expense of difficult cold starts. Mazda resolved this in the Skyactiv-D by using piezoelectric fuel injectors with multiple nozzles that changes the pattern depending on operating conditions. Furthermore, exhaust valves are left slightly open as the engine starts causing exhaust gases to be sucked into the cylinders helping the engine to warm up quickly.

Early issues 
The CX-5 with Skyactiv-D engines were reported to have oil levels rising earlier than expected upon release, which required owners to check the vehicle's engine oil every 1000 kilometres or every month and return to the dealer if the oil appeared over the level of the dipstick. This procedure was initiated by Mazda worldwide as a precaution. Mazda did however resolve the issue in the first few months of the engine being available, with the resolution being a software change and a change of dipsticks with a corrected level.

Emission standards and tests 
At launch in 2012, Mazda claimed the Skyactiv-D engine would only comply with Euro 5 emission standards (NOx of 0.18 g/km), and further work was required to achieve stricter emission standards.

In the aftermath of the Volkswagen emissions scandal, the Japanese government performed testing of all diesel engines produced in Japan to ensure Japanese manufacturers were not falsifying emissions as had been done by Volkswagen. It was determined that the Skyactiv-D engine was the only engine which tested at or near the standard.

Achieving US EPA emission standards 
At the 2019 New York Motor show, Mazda announced that it would commence pre-sales of the 2019 CX-5 with the Skyactiv-D 2.2L engine. To achieve the US EPA emissions standards though has resulted is significant performance and economy penalties in comparison with the Euro 5 compliant engine. The Australian version of the engine is a good comparison with that in the US, with both countries requiring identical diesel quality and using the higher specification of the engine.

The Euro stage V compliant Australian Skyactiv-D 2.2L has the following specifications:

 Power:  @ 4,500 rpm
 Torque:  @ 2,000 rpm
 Fuel consumption (Australian ADR 81/02)
 Combined 5.7 L/100 km (41.3 mpg)
 City 6.5 L/100 km (36.2 mpg)
 Highway 5.2 L/100 km (45.2 mpg)

The US EPA compliant US Skyactiv-D 2.2l has the following specifications:

 Power: 168 hp @ 4,000 rpm
 Torque: 290 lb-ft @ 2,000 rpm
 EPA Estimated fuel economy:
 City 27 mpg
 Highway 30 mpg

Recall
In September 2016, Mazda recalled 130,000 vehicles in Japan over a defect that could lead to diesel engine failure.

Although most problems were fixed later on the 2.2 suffered from bad carbon build up that would block the intake manifold. Other faults include the turbo diversion valve failure that required replacement of the complete twin turbo unit.

Mazda recalled 2012 to 2018 diesel Mazda 3, Mazda 6 and CX-5 because of carbon deposits build-up.

Skyactiv-Hybrid
The Skyactiv-Hybrid technology is an electric hybrid engine technology using Skyactiv-G engine with technology from Toyota's Hybrid Synergy Drive, originally licensed for use with the Sky engine for vehicles sold in 2013.

The first retail Mazda Skyactiv-Hybrid vehicle, a Mazda3 Skyactiv-Hybrid with Skyactiv-G 2.0 engine with 14:1 compression, was unveiled at the 2013 Tokyo Motor Show.

Skyactiv-CNG
The Skyactiv-CNG engine is powered by compressed natural gas. The first retail Mazda Skyactiv-CNG prototype vehicle, a Mazda3 Skyactiv-CNG Concept, was unveiled in 2013 Tokyo Motor Show.

Skyactiv-R
The Skyactiv-R engine is Mazda's new generation rotary engine. However, the engine has never been shown to the public to prove its existence.

The Mazda RX-Vision Concept, powered by a Skyactiv-R rotary engine, was unveiled in 2015 Tokyo Motor Show.

e-Skyactiv
e-Skyactiv is the battery electric powertrain.

Applications:
 2020–present Mazda MX-30

e-Skyactiv-G
e-Skyactiv-G is the first Mild Hybrid powertrain.

Applications:
 2019–present Mazda3
 2019–present Mazda CX-30

Skyactiv-Drive
The Skyactiv-Drive is a family of automatic transmissions, named SKY-Drive. Mazda rejected dual-clutch technology in automatic transmissions, because the dual-clutch behavior in certain situations was sub-optimal. Instead, Mazda chose to re-design the conventional automatic transmission, making the torque converter take less duty while a multi-plate clutch disengages the torque converter most of the time. The new Skyactiv automatic transmission is designed to have six or eight gears forward, one reverse gear, a short torque converter, and a clutch integrated with the torque converter.

Skyactiv-MT
The Skyactiv-MT is a family of manual transmissions.

To achieve lighter shift effort with a short shift lever stroke, the lever ratio is increased. However, to overcome the shorter internal stroke, a small module spline is used. Shift throws are reduced by 15 percent, making it the shortest shifting of any passenger car.

To allow weight reduction, the triple-shafted gear train is made with reverse and first gears on the same shaft, and the use of a shorter secondary shaft.

Skyactiv-Body
The Skyactiv-Body is a next-generation, lightweight, highly-rigid car body, with improved crash safety performance. It is 8% lighter and 30% more rigid than previous generations.

Applications:
 2020–present Mazda MX-30

Skyactiv Multi-Solution Scalable Architecture
The Skyactiv Multi-Solution Scalable Architecture is a rear-wheel drive and all-wheel drive car platform designed with a longitudinal engine layout.

Applications:
 2022–present Mazda CX-60
 2023–present Mazda CX-90

References

External links
Mazda SkyActiv Technology page
Mazda Canada SkyActiv Technology page

Engine technology
Mazda